Stepnohirsk is an urban-type settlement in Vasylivka Raion of Zaporizhzhia Oblast in Ukraine. The settlement is located on the left bank of the Dnieper, dammed here and forming Kakhovka Reservoir. Stepnohirsk hosts the administration of Stepnohirsk settlement hromada, one of the hromadas of Ukraine. Population:

Transport
There is some passenger traffic.

The settlement is on highway M18 which connects Zaporizhzhia and Melitopol.

People from Stepnohirsk 
 Yehor Demchenko (born 1997), Ukrainian footballer

References

Urban-type settlements in Vasylivka Raion
Populated places on the Dnieper in Ukraine